Eupithecia propagata is a moth in the family Geometridae. It is found in India, Nepal, Bhutan and China. It is on wing from late July to late October.

Adults have rusty brown forewings with a number of black and white markings, and off-white hindwings with a dark streak along the posterior edge and corner. It is smaller and darker than Eupithecia refertissima, which it otherwise resembles in outward appearance.

References

Moths described in 1926
propagata
Moths of Asia